Sciopsyche is a genus of moths in the subfamily Arctiinae. The genus was erected by Arthur Gardiner Butler in 1876.

Species
 Sciopsyche tropica Walker, 1854

Former species
 Sciopsyche remissa Dognin, 1902

References

Arctiinae